Dilan Andrés Ortiz Aragón (born 15 March 2000) is a Colombian football forward who plays for Russian club Ufa.

Club career
Born in Popayán, Ortiz came through the youth ranks of Atlético Nacional. At club level, Ortíz made his debut playing on loan at Real Cartagena making 14 appearances and scoring twice in the 2018 Categoría Primera B season. Then, in June next year, at the end of the first semester of the 2019 Categoría Primera B season, the loan contract expired and Ortíz left Real Cartagena. He returned to his club, Nacional, but he soon arranged a new loan deal, this time in Europe, with Čukarički from Serbia. He debuted in the 2019–20 Serbian SuperLiga on 6 March 2020, in a home game against Spartak Subotica, a 4–1 win.

On 21 January 2022, he joined Russian Premier League club Ufa on loan with an option to buy. On 21 May 2022, Ortiz scored the winning goal for FC Ufa in the 90th minute in a 2–1 away victory over FC Rubin Kazan in the last matchday of the league season, which allowed Ufa to avoid direct relegation and forced Rubin's relegation instead. Ufa was nevertheless relegated a week later after losing in relegation play-offs to FC Orenburg, conceding the decisive goal in the 3rd added minute of the return leg. Ufa did not exercise their purchase option following the relegation.

On 25 June 2022, Ortiz returned to Ufa and signed a long-term contract.

International career
Ortiz was part of the Colombian U-20 team at the 2019 South American U-20 Championship.

Honors
Atlético Nacional
Florida Cup: 2020

Career statistics

References

2000 births
People from Popayán
Sportspeople from Cauca Department
Living people
Colombian footballers
Association football forwards
FK Čukarički players
FK Mačva Šabac players
Atlético Nacional footballers
Real Cartagena footballers
FK Proleter Novi Sad players
FC Ufa players
Categoría Primera B players
Serbian SuperLiga players
Russian Premier League players
Russian First League players
Colombian expatriate footballers
Colombian expatriate sportspeople in Serbia
Expatriate footballers in Serbia
Colombian expatriate sportspeople in Russia
Expatriate footballers in Russia